William Jidayi (born 9 August 1984) is an Italian former footballer.

Personal life
William's brother Christian is currently a professional footballer. Born in Italy, Jidayi is of Nigerian descent.

After retiring as a player, he left the footballing world to join the municipal police force of the city of Cervia as a police officer.

References

1984 births
Sportspeople from Ravenna
Living people
Italian footballers
Association football defenders
Ravenna F.C. players
Association football midfielders
A.S. Melfi players
Italian people of Nigerian descent
Italian sportspeople of African descent
S.S.D. Castel San Pietro Terme Calcio players
U.S. Sassuolo Calcio players
Calcio Padova players
S.S. Juve Stabia players
U.S. Russi players
A.S. Cittadella players
U.S. Avellino 1912 players
F.C. Pro Vercelli 1892 players
Serie B players
Serie C players
Footballers from Emilia-Romagna